Daniel Swarovski (24 October 1862 – 23 January 1956) was a Bohemian-born Austrian glass cutter, jeweler, and founder of the Swarovski crystal dynasty.

Early life
Swarovski was born in Georgenthal, Bohemia, Austrian Empire (now Jiřetín pod Bukovou, Czech Republic), the son of Franz Anton Swarovski and Helene Swarovski (née Staffen). He was born in the Jizera Mountains,  from the current border with Poland. Like many in the area, his father was a glass cutter, and Swarovski first learned the art of glass-cutting in his father's small factory. He was educated in Paris and Vienna, where he met electrical engineer František Křižík, and became interested in electricity at the 1883 Electricity Exhibition in Vienna.

Career
In 1892, Swarovski patented an electric cutting machine that facilitated the production of lead crystal glass jewelry, which until then had to be cut by hand. In 1895, he moved to Austria proper and partnered with Armand Kosman and Franz Weis to form "A. Kosmann, D. Swarovski & Co." They built a crystal-cutting factory in Wattens in Tyrol, to take advantage of local hydroelectricity for the energy-intensive grinding processes Swarovski had patented.

In 1919, Swarovski founded the Tyrolit company, bringing the grinding and polishing tools from his crystal business into a different market. In 1949, Swarovski Optik KG was founded by his son Wilhelm Swarovski in Absam, Tyrol.

Personal life
In 1887, Swarovski married Marie Weis, the sister of his business partner Franz Weis, and they had three sons: Fritz, Alfred, and Wilhelm.

Honors
Knight of the Order of St. Gregory the Great
Bearer of the Great Emblem of Merit from the Republic of Austria
Owner of the Julius Raab Medal
Honorary member of the Leopold-Franzens-University of Innsbruck

Notes

References

External links

Swarovski Group: History

1862 births
1956 deaths
People from Jablonec nad Nisou District
People from the Kingdom of Bohemia
German Bohemian people
Austrian Nazis
Glass makers
Austrian jewellers
Austro-Hungarian businesspeople
Austrian businesspeople
Knights of St. Gregory the Great